General John Francis Cradock, 1st Baron Howden  (11 August 175926 July 1839) was a British peer, politician and soldier.

Life

He was son of John Cradock, Church of Ireland Archbishop of Dublin. In 1775 he was admitted to St John's College, Cambridge.

In 1777, he was appointed a cornet in the 4th Regiment of Horse, which in 1779 he exchanged to become an ensign in the Coldstream Guards, and in 1781 he was promoted a lieutenant with the rank of captain. In 1785 he purchased a commission as a major in the 12th Dragoons, exchanging this in 1786 for a post in the 13th Foot, where he was appointed lieutenant-colonel in 1789.

He commanded the 13th in the West Indies in 1790, and served a second time in the West Indies commanding a battalion of grenadiers in 1793, where he was wounded at the reduction of Martinique and appointed the aide-de-camp of Sir Charles Grey, receiving the thanks of Parliament for his services.

In 1795 he was appointed colonel of the 127th Foot, and placed on half-pay when that regiment was reduced in 1797. He was appointed major-general in 1798, and served in the Irish Rebellion of 1798 as quartermaster-general in Ireland, seeing action the Battle of Vinegar Hill. He accompanied Cornwallis in his campaign against the French forces landed in Ireland, and was severely wounded at the Battle of Ballinamuck.

Cradock entered the Irish House of Commons for Clogher in 1785. In 1790, he stood as Member of Parliament for Castlebar, a seat he held until 1798. He then represented Midleton from 1799 to 1800 and subsequently Thomastown to the Act of Union in 1801. The year before he had been appointed to command the second battalion of the 54th Foot, and again placed on half-pay when that battalion was reduced in 1802. In 1803 he was appointed to the 71st Foot.

In 1801 he was on the staff in the Mediterranean under Sir Ralph Abercromby, seeing action several times and serving as second-in-command of a division in the field.  After the surrender of Cairo and Alexandria, at which he was present, he was despatched with a force to occupy Corsica and Naples, but was recalled en route after the Peace of Amiens was signed.

He was then appointed Commander-in-Chief of the Madras Army; after the departure of Lord Lake, he commanded the whole of the forces in the Iberian Peninsula for almost a year. In 1808 he was appointed to command the forces in Portugal, handing over command to Arthur Wellesley on 22April 1809. From there moved to the command of the 43rd (Monmouthshire) Light Infantry in January 1809, briefly serving as the Governor of Gibraltar later that year.

In 1811 he was appointed Governor of the Cape Colony and commander of the forces on that station, resigning in 1814 and being succeeded by Lord Charles Somerset. He was promoted full general in 1814, elevated to the Peerage of Ireland as Baron Howden in 1819, and to the Peerage of the United Kingdom under the same title in 1831.

The town of Cradock, Eastern Cape, South Africa, is named after him.

On 17 November 1798 Cradock married Lady Theodosia Sarah Frances Meade (b. c. 1773; d. 13 Dec 1853), Lady Theodosia was the daughter of John Meade, 1st Earl of Clanwilliam, Cradock named the town of Clanwilliam, Western Cape after his father-in-law.

Notes

References

|-

 

|-

1759 births
1839 deaths
3rd Dragoon Guards officers
12th Royal Lancers officers
71st Highlanders officers
Alumni of St John's College, Cambridge
Barons in the Peerage of Ireland
Peers of Ireland created by George III
Peers of the United Kingdom created by William IV
British Army commanders of the Napoleonic Wars
British Army generals
British Army personnel of the French Revolutionary Wars
British East India Company people
Irish MPs 1783–1790
Irish MPs 1790–1797
Irish MPs 1798–1800
Knights Grand Cross of the Order of the Bath
Members of the Parliament of Ireland (pre-1801) for County Cork constituencies
Members of the Parliament of Ireland (pre-1801) for County Kilkenny constituencies
Members of the Parliament of Ireland (pre-1801) for County Mayo constituencies
Members of the Parliament of Ireland (pre-1801) for County Tyrone constituencies
People of the Irish Rebellion of 1798